Zhai Xiang (born 3 December 1992) is a Chinese para table tennis player. He won a gold medal at the 2016 Summer Paralympics.

Zhai's disability is due to a neural tube defect.

References

1992 births
Living people
Table tennis players at the 2016 Summer Paralympics
Paralympic medalists in table tennis
Medalists at the 2016 Summer Paralympics
Chinese male table tennis players
Paralympic gold medalists for China
Paralympic table tennis players of China
Table tennis players from Shaanxi
People from Baoji
Table tennis players at the 2020 Summer Paralympics